The second series of RuPaul's Drag Race UK began airing on 14 January 2021 on the BBC Three section of BBC iPlayer and WOW Presents Plus streaming service. The series was confirmed and casting was closed on 15 November 2019. Production was suspended mid 2020 due to the COVID-19 pandemic but resumed late 2020. The cast of 12 new queens was announced on 16 December 2020 and the series premiered on 14 January 2021. It was also announced a special episode RuPaul's Drag Race UK: Queens on Lockdown would air, following the queens during the first lockdown. This special episode was released on 12 February.

The winner of the second series of RuPaul's Drag Race UK was Lawrence Chaney, with Bimini Bon-Boulash and Tayce as the runners-up.

The United Kingdolls version of "UK Hun", which featured in the fifth episode of the series, reached number 27 in the Official UK Charts.

Cherry Valentine died on 18 September 2022 at the age of 28, of unknown causes and is the first contestant from RuPaul's Drag Race UK to pass away.

Contestants 

Ages, names, and cities stated are at time of filming.

Notes:

Contestant progress

Lip syncs
Legend:

Guest judges 
Listed in chronological order:
Elizabeth Hurley, actress, businesswoman and model
Sheridan Smith, actress and singer
Jourdan Dunn, model and actress
Lorraine Kelly, television presenter
MNEK, singer and music producer
Jessie Ware, singer
Maya Jama, television presenter
Dawn French, actress, comedienne, writer and presenter

Special guests
Guests who appeared in episodes, but did not judge on the main stage.

Episode 1
Kevin McDaid, photographer

Episode 2
Dane Chalfin, vocal coach
Jay Revell, choreographer
Kieran Daley Ward, choreographer

Episode 3
Jodie Harsh, drag queen and DJ music producer

Episode 5
Ian Masterson, producer and songwriter

Episode 6
Gemma Collins, media personality and businesswoman
The Vivienne, winner of RuPaul's Drag Race UK Series 1
Baga Chipz, third place contestant of RuPaul's Drag Race UK Series 1

Episode 7
Raven, runner-up on both the second season of RuPaul's Drag Race and first season of RuPaul's Drag Race All Stars 

Episode 9
Natalie Cassidy, EastEnders actress

Episodes

References

2021 British television seasons
RuPaul's Drag Race UK seasons
Television series impacted by the COVID-19 pandemic
Impact of the COVID-19 pandemic on the LGBT community
2021 in LGBT history